Vilma Verónica Zamora Suñol (born c. 1977), from the Mexican state of Guanajuato is a beauty pageant title holder.  She won the title of Nuestra Belleza Mundo México in 1998, and represented her country in the 1998 Miss World pageant, held in Seychelles on November 26, 1998.  She also represented México in Colombia in "Reinado Internacional de las flores" and in Honduras in "Señorita Continente Americano" winning the 1st runner up.

References

Living people
Nuestra Belleza México winners
Miss World 1998 delegates
Models from Guanajuato
1970s births